Bastaji may refer to:
 Bastaji, Bosnia and Herzegovina
 Veliki Bastaji, Croatia
 Mali Bastaji, Croatia
 Bastaji, Nikšić, Montenegro